Lentisco is a common name for several plants and may refer to:

Malosma laurina, native to California
Pistacia lentiscus, native to the Mediterranean